The Communist Party USA is a Marxist–Leninist political party in the United States.

Communist Party USA may also refer to:
 Communist Party USA (Marxist–Leninist), a Maoist organization
 Communist Party USA (Opposition), a defunct political party
 Communist Party USA (Provisional), a clandestine communist group
 Revolutionary Communist Party, USA, a Marxist–Leninist-Maoist organization

See also 
 The Communist Party USA and African Americans
 Communist Party (disambiguation)